The 1986 Princeton Tigers football team was an American football team that represented Princeton University during the 1986 NCAA Division I-AA football season. Princeton tied for second-to-last in the Ivy League.

In their second and final year under head coach Ron Rogerson, the Tigers compiled a 2–8 record and were outscored 262 to 123. Kevin L. Armstrong and Edwin J. Elton were the team captains.

Princeton's 2–5 conference record tied for sixth in the Ivy League standings. The Tigers were outscored 145 to 81 by Ivy opponents.

Princeton played its home games at Palmer Stadium on the university campus in Princeton, New Jersey.

Schedule

References

Princeton
Princeton Tigers football seasons
Princeton Tigers football